
Gmina Jasienica Rosielna is a rural gmina (administrative district) in Brzozów County, Subcarpathian Voivodeship, in south-eastern Poland.

The gmina contains part of the protected area called Czarnorzeki-Strzyżów Landscape Park.

Villages
Gmina Jasienica Rosielna contains the villages and settlements of Blizne, Jasienica Rosielna, Orzechówka and Wola Jasienicka.

Neighbouring gminas
Gmina Jasienica Rosielna is bordered by the gminas of Brzozów, Domaradz, Haczów and Korczyna.

References
 Polish official population figures 2006

Jasienica Rosielna
Brzozów County